The 2008 Tunbridge Wells Borough Council election took place on 1 May 2008 to elect members of Tunbridge Wells Borough Council in Kent, England. One third of the council was up for election and the Conservative Party stayed in overall control of the council.

After the election, the composition of the council was:
Conservative 44
Liberal Democrat 4

Election result
The results saw the Conservatives retain control after gaining 3 seats from the Liberal Democrats to have 44 seats compared to 4 for the Liberal Democrats.

Ward results

References

2008 English local elections
2008
2000s in Kent